"Foreign Land" is a song by Australian rock band, Eskimo Joe. It was released in April 2009 as the lead single from their
fourth studio album Inshalla. The song was the most added song on Australian radio in April 2009, and peaked at number 13 on the ARIA Charts and was certified gold. The single contains elements of traditional Turkish folk music from Adiyaman, Turkey.

The song was written as a tribute to Australian actor Heath Ledger, who died in January 2008.

The song placed second in the 2009 Vanda & Young Global Songwriting Competition.

At the APRA Music Awards of 2010, the song won Most Played Australian Work and Rock Work of the Year.

Background
The lyrics were borne from a poignant day in New York City when an emotionally drained Temperley stepped out for a walk. 

The song has been used on TV shows such as The World's Strictest Parents and Sunday Night.

Track listing

Charts

Certifications

Release history

References

2009 singles
2009 songs
APRA Award winners
Eskimo Joe songs
Song recordings produced by Gil Norton
Commemoration songs
Songs written by Joel Quartermain
Songs written by Kavyen Temperley
Songs written by Steve Parkin (musician)
Songs written by Stuart MacLeod (musician)
Warner Music Group singles